Josef Stefan (24 March 1835 – 7 January 1893) was an ethnic Carinthian Slovene physicist, mathematician, and poet of the Austrian Empire.

Life and work 
Stefan was born in an outskirt village of St. Peter (today a district of Klagenfurt) in the Austrian Empire (now in Austria) to father Aleš (Aleksander) Stefan, born in 1805, and mother Marija Startinik, born 1815. His parents, both ethnic Slovenes, married when Josef was eleven. The Stefans were a modest family. His father was a milling assistant and his mother served as a maidservant. Stefan's mother died in 1863 and his father in 1872. Josef was their only child.

Stefan attended elementary school in Klagenfurt, where he showed his talent. As a thirteen-year-old boy, he experienced the revolutionary year of 1848, which inspired him to be sympathetic toward Slovene literary production.

After having graduated top of his class in high school, he briefly considered joining the Benedictine Order, but his great interest in physics prevailed. He left for Vienna in 1853 to study mathematics and physics. His professor of physics in the gymnasium was Karel Robida, who wrote the first Slovene physics textbook. Stefan then earned his habilitation in mathematical physics at the University of Vienna in 1858. During his student years, he also wrote and published a number of poems in Slovene.

Stefan taught physics at the University of Vienna, was Director of the Physical Institute from 1866, Vice-President of the Vienna Academy of Sciences, and member of several scientific institutions in Europe. He died in Vienna, Austria-Hungary. His life and work have been extensively studied by the physicist Janez Strnad.

Work
Stefan published nearly 80 scientific articles, mostly in the Bulletins of the Vienna Academy of Sciences. He is best known for originating Stefan's law in 1879, a physical power law stating that the total radiation from a black body is proportional to the fourth power of its thermodynamic temperature T:

He derived this law from the measurements of the French physicists Dulong and Petit. As both incident radiation and blackbody emission are always equal, this equation applies equally to the temperature of any ideal body subject to incident radiation across its surface. In 1884, the law was extended to apply to grey-body emissions by Stefan's student Ludwig Boltzmann and hence is known as Stefan–Boltzmann law. Boltzmann treated a heat engine with light as a working matter. This law is the only physical law of nature named after a Slovene physicist. Today, the law is derived from Planck's law of black-body radiation:

With his law, Stefan determined the temperature of the Sun's surface, which he calculated to be . This was the first sensible value for the temperature of the Sun.

Stefan provided the first measurements of the thermal conductivity of gases, treated evaporation, and among others studied diffusion, heat conduction in fluids. For his treatise on optics, the University of Vienna bestowed the Lieben Prize on him. Because of his early work in calculating evaporation and diffusion rates, flow from a droplet or particle that is induced by evaporation or sublimation at the surface is now called the Stefan flow.

Very important are also his electromagnetic equations, defined in vector notation, and works in the kinetic theory of heat. Stefan was among the first physicists in Europe who fully understood Maxwell's electromagnetic theory and one of the few outside England who expanded on it. He calculated inductivity of a coil with a quadratic cross-section, and he corrected Maxwell's miscalculation. He also researched a phenomenon called the skin effect, where high-frequency electric current is greater on the surface of a conductor than in its interior.

In mathematics, the Stefan problems or Stefan's tasks with movable boundary are well known. The problem was first studied by Lamé and Clapeyron in 1831. Stefan solved the problem when he was calculating how quickly a layer of ice on water grows (Stefan's equation).

Eponymous terms  

In physics, several concepts are named after Joseph Stefan. In particular:
 Stefan–Boltzmann law
 Stefan–Boltzmann constant σ
 Stefan adhesion
 Stefan problem
 Stefan's equation
 Stefan's formula
 Stefan flow
 Stefan number
 Stefan tube
 Maxwell–Stefan diffusion

The Jožef Stefan Institute was also named after him.

References

External links 

 "Josef Stefan: His life and legacy in the thermal sciences," Experimental Thermal and Fluid Science, Volume 31, Issue 7, July 2007,s 795–803, by John C. Crepeau
 
 Extended biography of Josef Stefan, by John C. Crepeau

1835 births
1893 deaths
Slovenian physicists

Austrian physicists
Austrian male poets
Slovenian poets
Slovenian male poets
Carinthian Slovenes
Fluid dynamicists
Scientists from Klagenfurt
Slovene Austro-Hungarians
19th-century Austrian poets
Austro-Hungarian mathematicians
19th-century male writers
Rectors of universities in Austria